Her Last Part or Her Final Role (French:Son dernier rôle) is a 1946 French drama film directed by Jean Gourguet and starring Gaby Morlay, Jean Debucourt and Marcel Dalio. A top actress discovers that she is seriously ill.

Cast
 Gaby Morlay as Hermine Wood  
 Jean Debucourt as Le professeur Mercier  
 Marcel Dalio as Ardouin  
 Jean Tissier as L'hôtelier 
 Georges Chamarat as Le suicidé 
 Germaine Charley  
 Paula Dehelly   
 Paul Demange  
 Gabrielle Fontan
 Germaine Ledoyen    
 Héléna Manson 
 Nina Myral  
 Roger Vincent

References

Bibliography 
 Rège, Philippe. Encyclopedia of French Film Directors, Volume 1. Scarecrow Press, 2009.

External links 
 

1946 films
1946 drama films
French drama films
1940s French-language films
French films based on plays
French black-and-white films
Films about diseases
Films directed by Jean Gourguet
1940s French films